Amelia Greene Legge (1794, New York - 1873) was an American actress. She started acting in 1799 when she appeared on stage for the first time.

Work 
Mrs. Stone started acting at a young age, first appearing on stage in 1799 in Charleston. She later starred in "Infidelity" in 1837, "Gaulantus the Gault" in 1839, and "The Destruction of Jerusalem" in 1839, all of which were written my her second husband, Nathaniel Bannister.

In Mrs. Stone's active years, she was a member of New York's City Theatre Company, the Lafayette Amphitheatre company, and the New Chatham Theatre company.

Family 
In 1821, Amelia Greene Legge married actor and playwright, John Augustus Stone. The two had a family of two boys, Christopher Lucius and Henry. The whole family moved to Philadelphia in 1831.

In 1834, John was having periods of insanity from the grief of poverty. He took his own life by jumping into the Schuylkill River in Philadelphia leaving Mrs. Legge a widow.

Mrs. Stone was remarried 1837 to a different actor and playwright, Nathaniel Bannister, with whom she worked for by starring in a selection of plays he wrote.

After Nathaniel's death in 1847, Mrs. Stone did not remarry.

References 

1794 births
1873 deaths
American stage actresses